B.R Shetty (born 1 August 1942) is an Indian-born businessman who is the founder and acquirer of a number of companies based in the United Arab Emirates, including Abu Dhabi-based NMC Health, Neopharma, BRS Ventures, and Finablr. Shetty's initial interest in 1975 was in hospitals and hospitality and has since diversified into pharmaceuticals, financial services, retail, advertising and information technology. He was included on the Forbes list of India's 100 Richest People in 2015 and was listed as the 42nd richest person in 2020.

In 2020, Shetty resigned from his board position while investigations were underway. On April 8, 2020, NMC Health went into Administration in UK due corporate governance concerns and a falling share price. Due to sharp drops in share prices and shares pledged by Shetty to pay for debts incurred, it is believed that his net worth has fallen to a fraction of the earlier estimate of $3.5 billion. Consequently, Forbes dropped Shetty from its 2020 annual list of billionaires.

On 15 April 2020,  Abu Dhabi Commercial Bank filed a criminal complaint against NMC Health with the Attorney General's Office of UAE. Now, Indian agencies have initiated probe to identify potential risks to Indian banks, if any. On 27 April 2020, the Central Bank of UAE ordered the freezing of his accounts and the blacklisting of his firms.

Early life
Shetty was born in Udupi on 1 August 1942 into a ethnic Tuluva family of the Bunt caste, the son of Shambhu Shetty and his wife Koosamma Shetty. His mother tongue is Tulu and he studied in a Kannada medium school. Shetty completed his pharmaceutical education from Manipal in India and also served as the Vice-Chairman of the Municipal Council in Udupi. He married Chandrakumari Shetty and has four children.

Career

Shetty immigrated to the UAE in the year 1973. After working as the country's first medical representative, he founded New Medical Centre Health (NMC) in 1975 to fill the need for personalized, cost-effective healthcare accessible to all. At that time, his wife was the only doctor in the clinic. NMC is now the largest private healthcare provider in the UAE with over four million patients annually across 45 facilities spread over 12 cities and 8 countries, including UAE, KSA, Oman, Spain, Italy, Denmark, Colombia, and Brazil. It is the first healthcare company from the Gulf Cooperation Countries (GCC) and the first company from Abu Dhabi to be listed on the premium segment of the London Stock Exchange and was part of the coveted FTSE 100 Index. Consequent to the request from the NMC board of directors and an on-going investigation of potential financial irregularities, the company was de-listed from London Stock Exchange and was removed from FTSE 100 index.

Shetty managed to take over the ownership of UAE Exchange from its founder Daniel Varghese in 1980 with the help of an Emirati and a former UAE Minister of Justice, Abdulla Humaid Al Mazroei. UAE Exchange was founded by Daniel Varghese in an attempt to ease the process of sending money by the expats to their families in their respective home countries. By 2016, it had expanded into over 31 countries and had approximately 800 direct offices. In 2014, it did over US$50 billion collectively in money remittance and exchange volumes. Shetty acquired Travelex, a major foreign exchange company, in 2014. Travelex has a global footprint including 1500 stores and 1300 ATMs across 27 countries. In December 2020 it was announced that Shetty had agreed to sell his majority stake in Finablr, the parent group for UAE Exchange and Travelex, to Prism Group AG and Royal Strategic Partners, a UAE linked investment fund.

In 2003, Shetty founded NMC Neopharma, a UAE-based pharmaceutical manufacturer. Inaugurated by the then President of India, A. P. J. Abdul Kalam in Abu Dhabi, Neopharma is centered on using the concept of modular manufacturing following global benchmarks in manufacturing technology and putting in place efficient control mechanisms. Neopharma has a research and development wing and works to provide quality medicines at affordable prices. The company also contracts manufacturing for international pharmaceutical companies as well as generic brands for companies including, but not limited to, Merck, Pfizer, AstraZeneca, and Boots UK.

In 2012, Shetty led NMC through an IPO on the London Stock Exchange, which raised $330 million. The funds went towards building a specialty hospital in Khalifa City, Abu Dhabi.

In June 2016, Shetty announced that he was building the first medical university in Abu Dhabi in honor of Sheikh Zayed. That same month, he was elected to be chairman of the Indian Business/Professional Group. In August 2016, Shetty announced that he was building a 400-bed super-specialty hospital in Udupi in Karnataka through B R S Ventures. Shetty also owned a hospital in Alexandria, two hospitals in Nepal, and acquired a hospital in Cairo as part of his personal portfolio under the same company.

In August 2019, BRS Ventures announced plans to invest $5 billion in developing healthcare facilities across India.

In February 2020, Bloomberg News report cast doubts on his real holding amidst the short-selling of NMC Health by Muddy Waters Research Also in February 2020, Shetty was ousted from the NMC Health board following a corporate governance scandal over his holdings in the company.

On April 8, 2020, NMC went into Administration in UK due to insolvency of the company.

Philanthropy 
In May 2018, Shetty along with three other Abu Dhabi-based business tycoons signed The Giving Pledge Forbes Article

Other activities
B.R. Shetty was an activist of the erstwhile Jan Sangh, the predecessor to the BJP before he went to the UAE. Shetty had played a key role in organizing a visit of Modi to Abu Dhabi. Shetty has invested in a medical institution in the north Indian state of Uttarakhand. He is the founder and patron of the Indian Pharmaceutical Association in the Emirates and is a member of the Advisory Board (Financial Sector), Economic Department, Government of Dubai, UAE, and the Pharmaceutical Committee, Dubai. He was the chairman of Abu Dhabi Indian School, Abu Dhabi Indian School-Branch 1, Al Wathba, and Bright Riders School till 2019. His position in Abu Dhabi Indian School and Abu Dhabi Indian School-Branch 1, Al Wathba was taken up by the UAE-based Indian billionaire Yusuff Ali M.A.

In August 2015, Shetty was elected as the chairman to the board of directors of UAE Exchange. He was named chairman of The Indian Business/Professional Group in June 2016. Sheikh Mohammed bin Rashid al Maktoum nominated Shetty as a member of the UAE medical council in September 2016.

In April 2017, Shetty announced that he would invest Rs 1000 crore ($157.3 million) to produce a film with director V. A. Shrikumar Menon. The film, starring Mohanlal, was to be based on the novel Randamoozham, a retelling of Mahabharata.
In May 2019, however, the film was shelved due to creative issues.

Awards and recognition 

In 2005, Shetty was awarded the highest civilian distinction in the Emirate, the Abu Dhabi Awards. Given by Sheikh Mohammed bin Zayed Al Nahyan, the Crown Prince of Abu Dhabi, the first year the distinction was awarded. Also in 2005, U.S. India Friendship Society presented Shetty the Distinguished Entrepreneur Award.

The Indian government gave Shetty the Pravasi Bharatiya Samman awwrd in 2007. Shetty received the Padma Shri awarded by the President of India in 2009.

In July 2011, he received the Asian Achievers Award from the Human Achievers Foundation.

In September 2012, Pharma Leaders founded by Satya Brahma declared Shetty as Global Indian of the Year along with Kiran Mazumdar Shaw at 5th Annual Pharmaceutical Leadership Summit & Pharma Leaders Business Leadership Awards 2012 in Mumbai.

In 2013, Shetty was recognized as one of Asia's most promising leaders at the Asian Brand & Leadership Summit. In March 2013, he was awarded the International Achievers Summit's Lifetime Achievement Award. That same year, Shetty received the Asian Business Leadership Forum India-UAE Business Icons Award. He also received the 2013 Frost & Sullivan Lifetime Achievement Award.

In 2014, Forbes Middle East recognized Shetty with the Top Indian Leaders in the UAE Award. He also received the Lakshya Business Visionary Award in 2014. That same year, Shetty was recognized with the International Achievement Award at the Indian Innovator Awards.

In February 2015, the Indian Club - Bahrain recognized Shetty with a Centenary Award. He received the Deal of the Year Award at the 2015 Indian CEO Awards. In June 2015, Shetty received the Business Personality of the Year award from Crowe Horwath International. That same month, Shetty received the Arabian Indian Czars award.

Shetty received the Global Indian Achiever Award in 2015 from Sheikh Nahyan Bin Mubarak al Nahyan. Also in 2015, Prince Faisal Bin Saud Bin Musaed Bin Abdulaziz presented Shetty with the National Cultural Award. Shetty's company, NMC Healthcare, received the Frost & Sullivan Middle East Integrated Healthcare Company of the Year Award in 2015. That same year, MILAAP honored Shetty with a Lifetime Achievement Award.

At the 2015 Gulf Business Industry Awards, Shetty was recognized as the Healthcare Business Leader of the Year. In November 2015, he was felicitated by More Ignatius Jacobite Syrian Orthodox Cathedral in Dubai. Shetty's NMC Healthcare was recognized at the 6th Middle East Business Leaders Awards in 2015, where Shetty was given the Industry Excellence in Healthcare Award.

In 2016, Shetty received the Golden Peacock Lifetime Achievement Award for Business Leadership. Also in 2016, Shetty won the Business Excellence Award from the Indian Business & Professional Council. Middlesex University in Dubai awarded Shetty an Honorary Doctorate in 2016.

In January 2017, Shetty was honored at the Annual Health Awards with a special award for his contribution to the region's healthcare industry. The following month, Shetty received the Nadaprabhu Kempegowda International Award at the Kempegowda International Festival.

In May 2018 Shetty was recognized by Forbes Middle East among the top Indian leaders in the Arab world. In September 2018 Shetty received the C3 Lifetime Achievement Award.

References

External links
 Official website

Indian philanthropists
Mangaloreans
Tulu people
Recipients of the Padma Shri in trade and industry
Living people
People from Udupi district
Indian emigrants to the United Arab Emirates
1942 births
Businesspeople from Karnataka
Giving Pledgers
Indian businesspeople
20th-century Indian businesspeople
21st-century Indian businesspeople
Former billionaires
Karnataka municipal councillors
People from Chitradurga
People from Udupi
Recipients of Pravasi Bharatiya Samman